Zilupe Municipality is a former municipality in the historical region of Latgale, and the Latgale Planning Region in Latvia. The municipality was formed in 2002 by merging Zaļesje Parish and Zilupe. In 2009 it absorbed Lauderi Parish and Pasiene Parish, the administrative centre being Zilupe. Zilupe, Lauderi, Zaļesje and Pasiene are among the towns and villages located in the municipality. The population as of 2020 was 2,575.

On 1 July 2021, Zilupe Municipality ceased to exist and its territory was merged into Ludza Municipality.

Demographics

Ethnic composition 
As of 1 January 2010 the ethnic composition of the municipality is as follows:

See also 
 Administrative divisions of Latvia

References 

 
Former municipalities of Latvia